Hope is a census-designated place (CDP) in Kenai Peninsula Borough in the U.S. state of Alaska. It is eighty-seven miles south from Anchorage. As of the 2010 census the population was 192, up from 137 in 2000.

Geography
Hope is located at  (60.920280, -149.64028) (Sec. 33, T010N, R002W, Seward Meridian). Hope is located in the Seward Recording District.

Hope lies on the northern end of Kenai Peninsula, on the south shore of the Turnagain Arm of Cook Inlet. The community lies at the end of the  Hope Highway, northwest of the Seward Highway, near the mouth of Resurrection Creek.

The CDP includes the settlement of Hope in the valley of Resurrection Creek and extends east and west to the ridgecrests that define the valley. To the south it extends up Resurrection Creek to Palmer Creek on the east side and Gold Gulch on the west side. It is bordered to the east by the Sunrise CDP.

Climate
Hope has a dry-summer continental subarctic climate (Köppen Dsc).

History
"Hope City" was a mining camp for Resurrection Creek, established in 1896. The Hope post office began operating in 1897. Portions of the town were destroyed in the 1964 Good Friday earthquake.

There are two community associations.

The Hope Community Library was established in 1987. It resides in the Historic Hope schoolhouse, originally built in 1938.

Demographics

Hope first appeared on the 1920 U.S. Census as an unincorporated village. In 1980 it was made a census-designated place (CDP).

As of the census of 2000, there were 137 people, 77 households, and 35 families residing in the CDP. The population density was 2.6 people per square mile (1.0/km2). There were 175 housing units at an average density of 3.4/sq mi (1.3/km2). The racial makeup of the CDP was 91.97% White, 0.73% Black or African American, 2.19% Native American, 1.46% Asian, and 3.65% from two or more races. 2.19% of the population were Hispanic or Latino of any race.

There were 77 households, out of which 15.6% had children under the age of 18 living with them, 42.9% were married couples living together, 2.6% had a female householder with no husband present, and 54.5% were non-families. 53.2% of all households were made up of individuals, and 15.6% had someone living alone who was 65 years of age or older. The average household size was 1.78 and the average family size was 2.69.

In the CDP, the population was spread out, with 16.1% under the age of 18, 4.4% from 18 to 24, 22.6% from 25 to 44, 40.1% from 45 to 64, and 16.8% who were 65 years of age or older. The median age was 47 years. For every 100 females, there were 107.6 males. For every 100 females age 18 and over, there were 125.5 males.

The median income for a household in the CDP was $21,786, and the median income for a family was $24,432. Males had a median income of >$0 versus $37,656 for females. The per capita income for the CDP was $9,079. There were none of the families and 11.7% of the population living below the poverty line, including no under eighteens and 100.0% of those over 64.

Public services

Approximately one-fourth of homes use individual water wells and septic tank systems, and are fully plumbed. The school operates its own well water system. Many homes in this area are used only seasonally. The borough provides a refuse transfer site in Hope. Electricity is provided by Chugach Electric Association. There is one school located in the community, attended by 14 students. Local hospitals or health clinics include Central Peninsula General Hospital in Soldotna (907-262-4404) or Anchorage hospitals. Hope is classified as a highway village, and is found in EMS Region 2J in the Kenai Peninsula Region. Emergency services have highway and air access. Emergency service is provided by volunteers. Auxiliary health care is provided by Hope/Sunrise EMS (907-782-3174/3630): Central Peninsula Hospital in Soldotna or Anchorage hospitals.

Economy and transportation
The school and local retail businesses provide the only employment in Hope. Recreational gold prospecting, including gold panning, metal detecting, and dredging is available. Some commercial mining activities continue today. A small sawmill is used by the community. Two residents hold a commercial fishing permit.

Hope is accessible from the Seward Highway  to the southeast. Anchorage ( to the northwest by air;  by highway) and Kenai ( southwest by air;  by highway) offer a variety of transportation services.

Taxes:	Sales: 3% (Borough), Property: 6.5 mills (Borough), Special: None

References

External links

 State of Alaska, Division of Community Advocacy, Community Information Summary
 State of Alaska, Division of Community Advocacy, Community Photos

Census-designated places in Alaska
Census-designated places in Kenai Peninsula Borough, Alaska
Kenai Mountains-Turnagain Arm National Heritage Area
Mining communities in Alaska
Populated coastal places in Alaska on the Pacific Ocean